Daegu Physical Education High School is special-education school in Daegu in South Korea. The school's centered education summed up four ones. First, a person being respected by right manner and correct actions. Second, a creative person investigating education ability. Third, the person that basic physical strength and a special match function are excellent. Fourth, a person developing careerso as to meet talent, aptitude. The motto is "standing on the top".

History
The plan for establishing the school was approved on 20 May 1999, and the establishment process was completed on 15 December 2000. The first entrance ceremony was held on 5 March 2003.

References

Educational institutions established in 2003
High schools in Daegu
Sports schools
2003 establishments in South Korea